Sathonay-Village is a commune in the Metropolis of Lyon in Auvergne-Rhône-Alpes region in eastern France. The commune was created in 1908, when the former commune Sathonay was split into the communes of Sathonay-Camp and Sathonay-Village.

See also
 Communes of the Metropolis of Lyon

References

Communes of Lyon Metropolis